Alban George "Johnny" Moyes  (2 January 1893 – 18 January 1963) was a cricketer who played for South Australia and Victoria. Following his brief playing career, Moyes, a professional journalist, later gained greater fame as a writer and commentator on the game.

Cricket career

As a right-hand batsman Moyes scored 883 runs at an average of 29.43 and a highest score of 104 in 103 minutes, against Western Australia in his first season. His leg break bowling took 5 wickets at an average of 53.60, with best figures of 2 for 22. He was considered good enough to be selected for the Australian tour of South Africa in 1914, but this was cancelled because of the outbreak of the First World War. He played for the Rest of Australia against New South Wales and Victor Trumper was so impressed that he invited him to play as a guest for Gordon in a club match. However, he was dismissed for a first ball duck.

Moyes served with distinction in the First World War with the Australian Imperial Force in England and France, earning the Military Cross. He played in a number of services' matches in England and played two matches for Victoria.

Moving to Sydney as news editor and sports editor of leading newspapers, Moyes joined Gordon.  In one club game he scored 218 runs in 83 minutes.  He captained Gordon to a grade premiership in 1923–24, scoring 174 in the final.  As a state selector for New South Wales in 1926/27 Moyes helped Don Bradman get his first taste of interstate cricket.

Writing and radio career
Moyes became well known as a cricket commentator for the ABC between 1950 and 1963. Pollard describes him as "always bright and informative, a cheery character respected by players and listeners". He was a prolific author and wrote the first definitive history of Australian cricket in 1959. Other works included books on Australian batsmen, Australian bowlers, Bradman, Benaud, and many books of tours by Test nations. For his services to sport Moyes was appointed a Member of the Order of the British Empire.

Moyes died suddenly at his home, three days after commentating on the third Test of the 1962–63 series between Australia and England at Sydney. A few days before he died he asked the England vice-captain Colin Cowdrey to write a foreword to his book on the 1962–63 Ashes series:

Books by Johnny Moyes
 Cricket Notches (1935)
 Bradman (1948)
 A Century of Cricketers (1950)
 The Fight for the Ashes 1950–51: A critical account of the English tour in Australia (1951) 
 With the West Indies in Australia, 1951–52: A critical story of the tour (1952)
 The South Africans in Australia, 1952–53 (1953)
 Australian Bowlers: From Spofforth to Lindwall (1953)
 Australian Batsmen: From Charles Bannerman to Neil Harvey (1954)
 The Fight for the Ashes, 1954–55: A critical account of the English tour in Australia (1955)
 Australian Cricket: A history (1959)
 Benaud & Co.: The story of the Tests, 1958–59 (1959)
 With the West Indies in Australia, 1960–61: A critical story of the tour (1961)
 Benaud (1962)
 The Changing Face of Cricket (1963)
 With the M.C.C. in Australia, 1962–63 (1963) (completed by Tom Goodman)

References
Footnotes

Sources
 Pollard, Jack, Australian Cricket: The game and the players. Sydney, Hodder & Stoughton, 1982.
 Wisden, 1964 (obituary)

External links
 

1893 births
1963 deaths
Cricket historians and writers
Australian cricket commentators
Members of the Order of the British Empire
Victoria cricketers
South Australia cricketers
Australian recipients of the Military Cross
Australian military personnel of World War I
People from Gladstone, South Australia
Australian cricketers
Cricketers from South Australia